The Moran Medal in Statistical Sciences is awarded every two years by the Australian Academy of Science to recognise outstanding research by Australian scientists under 40 years of age in the fields of applied probability, biometrics,  mathematical genetics, psychometrics, and statistics.

This medal commemorates the work of the late Pat Moran, for his achievements in probability.

Winners
Source:

See also
 List of mathematics awards

Notes

External links
  Moran Medal site of the Australian Academy of Science

Mathematics awards
Australian Academy of Science Awards
Australian science and technology awards
Awards established in 1990